"Breakdown" is a single by hip-hop trio Group 1 Crew. It is the lead single from the album Outta Space Love and was released on May 11, 2010.

Track listing
1. "Breakdown" - 3:29

Appearances
"Breakdown" was used most notably in the show, America's Got Talent, by the dance group 'Studio One Young Beast Society' in their round of 48.

The song was also used in promo TV spots for the show Khloe and Kourtney.

References

2010 singles
American hip hop songs
2010 songs